Joe Taylor (born ) is an Australian former professional rugby league footballer who played as a  in the 1990s.

He played at club level for Paris Saint-Germain Rugby League in the Super League and the Manly-Warringah Sea Eagles in the NRL.

References

1975 births
Living people
Australian rugby league players
Manly Warringah Sea Eagles players
Paris Saint-Germain Rugby League players
Place of birth missing (living people)
Rugby league props